Microbacterium hydrocarbonoxydans is a Gram-positive and Crude oil-degrading bacterium from the genus Microbacterium which has been isolated from oil contaminated soil in Germany.

References

Further reading

External links
Type strain of Microbacterium hydrocarbonoxydans at BacDive -  the Bacterial Diversity Metadatabase

Bacteria described in 2005
hydrocarbonoxydans